Soe Win (born 22 October   1957) is a Burmese politician and former political prisoner who currently serves as an Amyotha Hluttaw MP for Rakhine State  No. 12 constituency. He is a member of National League for Democracy.

Early life and education
He was  born on  22 October 1957 in Gwa, Rakhine State, Burma(Myanmar). He graduated with B.A. (Philosophy) from Yangon University. He was joined NLD  at 1989 and served responsibilities of township and state. And then, He was involved in NLD Central Affairs Committee Responsibilities, Youth Reading Clubs and Religious Organizations. In 1974, Soe Win was arrested and sentenced to seven years prison because he was involved in the U Thant uprising of poster campaign at Gwa Township. After four months, he was freed by appeal.

Political career
He is a member of the National League for Democracy. In the Myanmar general election, 2015, he was elected as an Amyotha Hluttaw MP and elected representative from Rakhine State № 12 parliamentary   constituency.

References

National League for Democracy politicians
1957 births
Living people
People from Rakhine State
University of Yangon alumni
Burmese prisoners and detainees